Fraser McReight (born 19 February 1999) is an Australian rugby union player of Irish descent who plays for the Queensland Reds in Super Rugby and Australian rugby union team, the Wallabies. His playing position is flanker.

International career
McReight made his international debut in the first round of the 2019/20 Rugby Championship against New Zealand when Harry Wilson (rugby union) was substituted off for him in the 67th minute of the game in which the Wallabies lost 43 to 5. McReight scored his first test try against Argentina in round one of the 2021/22 Rugby Championship.

International Tries 
As of 27 August 2022.

Reference

External links
 Fraser McReight at Wallabies
 

1999 births
Australian rugby union players
Australia international rugby union players
Living people
Rugby union flankers
Brisbane City (rugby union) players
Queensland Reds players